János Baranyai (born June 24, 1984) is a Hungarian weightlifter and a former judo wrestler from Oroszlány, Hungary.

He competed at the 2006 World Championships and 2007 World Championships in the 77 kg category, ranking 33rd in both events.

On August 13, 2008 at the 2008 Summer Olympics in Beijing, China, Baranyai suffered a dislocated elbow while attempting to lift 148 kg in the men's 77 kg snatch.

After a two-year recovery and training period, Baranyai returned to international competitive weightlifting, participating both in the 2010 European Championships in Minsk and the 2010 World Championships in Antalya. At both events, he competed in the 85 kg category, and finished in the 7th and 15th places, respectively.

Major Results

References

1984 births
Hungarian male weightlifters
Living people
Weightlifters at the 2008 Summer Olympics
Olympic weightlifters of Hungary